Lissolepis is a genus of mid-sized skinks (adult snout-vent length 100–130 mm) with a bulky angular body and small eyes. 20–28 rows of midbody scales; dorsal scales smooth. The nasal scale has a postnarial groove; the subocular scale row is complete. Eyelids similar in colour to the adjacent scales. They were previously placed in the genus Egernia.

Species

Nota bene: A binomial authority in parentheses indicates that the species was originally described in a genus other than Lissolepis.

References

 
Lizard genera
Taxa named by Wilhelm Peters